Benedikt Waage Guðjónsson (14 June 1889 – 8 November 1966) was an Icelandic athlete and businessman. He was the chairman of the Sports Association of Iceland from 1926 to 1962 and a member of the International Olympic Committee from 1946 til his death. A well known athlete in Iceland in his youth, he was the first person to finish the Viðeyjarsund, when he swam the 4.4 km route from Viðey to Reykjavík on 6 September 1914.

References

1889 births
1966 deaths
Benedikt Waage
International Olympic Committee members